Sylvester Quarless is a politician from the island of Grenada. He is a member of the National Democratic Congress, represents the constituency of St Andrew Southwest in the House of Representatives of Grenada and is currently Grenada's Minister of Social Development.

References
Candidate biography (PDF file) 

Year of birth missing (living people)
Living people
Members of the House of Representatives of Grenada
National Democratic Congress (Grenada) politicians
Place of birth missing (living people)